Simeon Yankov (17 February 1899 – 3 September 1979) was a Bulgarian footballer. He competed in the men's tournament at the 1924 Summer Olympics.

References

1899 births
1979 deaths
Bulgarian footballers
Bulgaria international footballers
Olympic footballers of Bulgaria
Footballers at the 1924 Summer Olympics
Footballers from Sofia
Association football defenders
PFC Levski Sofia players